TSPY like 5 is a protein that in humans is encoded by the TSPYL5 gene.

References

Further reading